Edathumkara is a village in Maniyur Panchayath under Vatakara Taluk, Kozhikode District in Kerala where Vatakara-Mahe canal originates. It is approximately 12 km away from Vatakara Municipal Headquarters.

Geography
A natural hill in the west and a watershed area in the east, Edathumkara is known for its natural environment and for its migrating birds.

Education
M.H.E.S Arts and Science College Cherandathur is situated at Edathumkara.

Temples
Moozhikkal Bhagavathi Temple has a festival which is secular in outlook.

References

Villages in Kozhikode district
Vatakara area